Anne Jeffreys (born Annie Jeffreys Carmichael; January 26, 1923 – September 27, 2017) was an American actress and singer. She was the female lead in the 1950s TV series Topper.

Career
Jeffreys was born Annie Jeffreys Carmichael on January 26, 1923, in Goldsboro, North Carolina, Jeffreys entered the entertainment field at a young age, having her initial training in voice (she was an accomplished soprano). She became a member of the New York Municipal Opera Company on a scholarship and sang the lead at Carnegie Hall in such presentations as La bohème, Traviata, and Pagliacci. However, she decided as a teenager to sign with the John Robert Powers agency as a junior model.

Her plans for an operatic career were sidelined when she was cast in a staged musical revue, Fun for the Money. Her appearance in that revue led to her being cast in her first movie role, in I Married an Angel (1942), starring Nelson Eddy and Jeanette MacDonald. She was under contract to both RKO and Republic Studios during the 1940s, including several appearances as Tess Trueheart in the Dick Tracy series, and the 1944 Frank Sinatra musical Step Lively. She also appeared in the horror comedy Zombies on Broadway with Wally Brown and Alan Carney in 1945 and starred in Riffraff with Pat O'Brien two years later. Jeffreys also appeared in a number of western films and as bank robber John Dillinger's moll in 1945's Dillinger.

When her Hollywood career faltered, she instead focused on the stage, playing lead roles on Broadway in productions such as the 1947 opera Street Scene, the 1948 Cole Porter musical Kiss Me, Kate (having replaced Patricia Morison) and the 1952 musical Three Wishes for Jamie. With long-term husband Robert Sterling, she appeared in the CBS sitcom Topper (1953–1955), in which she was billed in a voiceover as "the ghostess with the mostest".

In 1955, she appeared in two TV musicals.  On April 9, she starred in the title role
of the Widow in the Max Liebman production of the "Merry Widow".  Later that year on 
November 26, she appeared with her husband in "Dearest Enemy", set during the American 
Revolution, also produced by Liebman.  

On December 18, 1957, Jeffreys and her husband played a couple with an unusual courtship arrangement brought about by an attack of the fever in the episode "The Julie Gage Story", broadcast in the first season of NBC's Wagon Train.

After a semi-retirement in the 1960s, she appeared on television, appearing in episodes of such series as Love, American Style (with her husband), L.A. Law and Murder, She Wrote. She was nominated for a Golden Globe for her work in The Delphi Bureau (1972). From 1984 to 1985, she starred in the short-lived Aaron Spelling series Finder of Lost Loves. She also appeared in Baywatch as David Hasselhoff's mother, and also had a recurring role in the night-time soap Falcon Crest as Amanda Croft.

In 1979, she guest starred as Siress Blassie in the Battlestar Galactica episode "The Man with Nine Lives" as a love interest of Chameleon, a part played by Fred Astaire. She was the last person to dance with him onscreen. She also guest starred as Prime Minister Dyne in the Buck Rogers in the 25th Century episode "Planet of the Amazon Women" as the leader of the titular planet.

Her most recent career was in daytime television; From 1984 to 2004, she appeared on the soap opera General Hospital (as well as its short-lived spinoff, Port Charles) in the recurring role of wealthy socialite Amanda Barrington, a long-time board member of both the hospital and ELQ. In her initial storyline, she was part of a blackmail scheme which led to the murder of Jimmy Lee Holt's mother, Beatrice, of whose death she was a suspect in. In the last year of Port Charles, Amanda last appeared on screen in 2004 when Amanda attended Lila Quartermain's funeral. In 2012, she appeared in an episode of California's Gold being interviewed, along with Ann Rutherford, by Huell Howser.

Recognition
Jeffreys' star in the Television category on the Hollywood Walk of Fame is at 1501 Vine Street. It was dedicated February 8, 1960. In 1997, she was a recipient of a Golden Boot Award as one who "furthered the tradition of the western on film and in television." In 1998, she received the Living Legacy Award from the Women's International Center.

Personal life

Jeffreys was married twice. Her first marriage, to Joseph Serena in 1945, was annulled in 1949. They had no children.

She married actor Robert Sterling in 1951. Sterling appeared with Jeffreys in one episode of the series Wagon Train ("The Julie Gage Story", in which their characters also married each other), and in Topper. In January 1958, the duo starred in another series, Love That Jill. It ran only three months, with 13 episodes shot. They had three sons: Jeffrey, Dana and Tyler. Robert Sterling died on May 30, 2006, at age 88.

A Republican, she and Sterling supported the campaign of Dwight Eisenhower during the 1952 presidential election. She was a Baptist.

In July 1956, Jeffreys' mother, Kate Jeffreys Carmichael, 67, was run down and killed by her own automobile in the driveway of her daughter's home. Police said Carmichael was taking books from the car's trunk when the emergency brake apparently slipped. The car rolled down the sloping driveway, dragging the actress's mother .

Death
Jeffreys died on September 27, 2017, at her home in Los Angeles at the age of 94. She was survived by her stepdaughter Tisha Sterling, her three sons, five grandchildren and two great-grandchildren.

Filmography

Film

Television

Selected musical theatre work
Street Scene (1947)
Kiss Me, Kate (1949)
Three Wishes for Jamie (1952)
Bells Are Ringing (1958)
Destry Rides Again (1960)
Kismet (1962)
Camelot (1963)
Do I Hear a Waltz? (1966)
Ninotchka (1966)
Pal Joey (1968)
The Desert Song (1968)
Song of Norway (1969)
The Most Happy Fella (1970)
The King and I (1974)
Follies (1977)
High Button Shoes (1978)
A High-Time Salute to Martin and Blane (1991 benefit concert)

References

External links

 
 
 
 Anne Jeffreys profiled in book
 Huell Howser interview of Anne Jeffreys and Ann Rutherford

1923 births
2017 deaths
Actresses from North Carolina
American women singers
American film actresses
American stage actresses
American television actresses
RKO Pictures contract players
People from Goldsboro, North Carolina
American musical theatre actresses
20th-century American actresses
21st-century American actresses
North Carolina Republicans
California Republicans
Baptists from North Carolina
Baptists from California
20th-century Baptists